鄂 (pinyin: è) may refer to the following:

The abbreviation for Hubei Province, People's Republic of China
E (name)
E (state), an ancient Chinese state whose area partly coincides with present-day Hubei
Ezhou, prefecture-level city in Hubei
 Echeng, a district of Ezhou